Sevda Valiyeva (born 24 December 1997) is an Azerbaijani Paralympic judoka. She won the gold medal in the women's 57 kg event at the 2020 Summer Paralympics held in Tokyo, Japan.

References

External links 
 

Living people
1997 births
Azerbaijani female judoka
Paralympic judoka of Azerbaijan
Paralympic gold medalists for Azerbaijan
Paralympic medalists in judo
Judoka at the 2020 Summer Paralympics
Medalists at the 2020 Summer Paralympics
Place of birth missing (living people)
21st-century Azerbaijani women